Big Tremaine is a 1916 American silent romantic drama film directed by Henry Otto and starring Harold Lockwood, May Allison, Lester Cuneo, Albert Ellis, Lillian Hayward, and William Ehfe. It is based on the 1914 novel of the same name by Marie Van Vorst. The film was released by Metro Pictures on November 20, 1916.

Plot

Cast
Harold Lockwood as John Tremaine, Jr.
May Allison as Isobel Malvern
Lester Cuneo as Redmond Malvern
Albert Ellis as Judge Tremaine
Lillian Hayward as Mrs. Tremaine
William Ehfe as David Tremaine
Andrew Arbuckle as Samuel Leavitt
Josephine Rice as Mammy
William De Vaull as John Nolan
Virginia Southern as Julia Cameron

Preservation
The film is now considered lost.

See also
List of lost films

References

External links

1916 romantic drama films
American romantic drama films
1916 films
American silent feature films
American black-and-white films
Metro Pictures films
Lost American films
Films based on American novels
Films directed by Henry Otto
1910s American films
Silent romantic drama films
Silent American drama films